The 1953–54 Ranji Trophy was the 20th season of the Ranji Trophy. Bombay won the title defeating Holkar in the final.

Zonal Matches

Central Zone

West Zone

South Zone 

(T) – Advanced to next round by spin of coin.

East Zone

North Zone

Inter-Zonal Knockout matches

Final

Scorecards and averages
Cricketarchive

References

External links

1954 in Indian cricket
Indian domestic cricket competitions